SurfGirl magazine is a surf and beach lifestyle magazine for women. It was the first independent magazine for women's surfing in the UK. SurfGirl is now distributed through the US, Australia, Portugal, South Africa, Germany, and France. The magazine produces content on film, travel and lifestyle centered around the sport aforementioned. It is published twice a year in April and October. 

The magazine was established and first published a print edition in 2002. Besides its paper edition, the magazine produces digital content and distributes it through it's social media accounts.

History and profile
SurfGirl was founded in 2002. The magazine targets women of all ages and abilities who are interested in surfing and surf culture. It features news, travel articles, interviews with professional surfers and UK riders, surfing tips, beauty and health advice, and articles on fashion.

According to SurfGirl's own website, the magazine is published two times a year and has international distribution. The magazine is published by Orca Publications at their Berry Road Studios, in Newquay, Cornwall.

References

External links
 SurfGirl's Website

Sports magazines published in the United Kingdom
Women's magazines published in the United Kingdom
Magazines established in 2002
Mass media in Cornwall
Surf culture
Surfing magazines
Quarterly magazines published in the United Kingdom